Ferncliff may refer to one of the following places in the United States:

Ferncliff, Bainbridge Island, Washington
Ferncliff Camp & Conference Center, a Presbyterian facility located in Pulaski County, Arkansas
Ferncliff Cemetery
Ferncliff Farm, formerly an estate of the Astor family
Ferncliff Forest, a nature preserve that was once part of the Astor family's Ferncliff Farm estate 
Ferncliff Peninsula Natural Area